American rock band The Shins have recorded songs for four studio albums, compilation appearances and bonus tracks.

Songs

See also
The Shins discography

Notes

References

External links
The Shins

Shins
The Shins songs